Jak McCourt (born 6 July 1995) is an English professional footballer who plays as a midfielder for  club Buxton.

He began his career with Leicester City. McCourt spent part of the 2013–14 season on loan at Torquay United and then September 2015 on loan at Port Vale, before being sold to Barnsley in January 2016. An unused substitute in the club's victorious 2016 League One play-off final, he was released by Barnsley in June 2016, and subsequently joined Northampton Town. He was released by Northampton in July 2017 by mutual agreement, and subsequently joined Chesterfield. He signed with Swindon Town in July 2018 and then moved on to Macclesfield Town in June 2019. Macclesfield Town were liquidated at the end of the 2019–20 season. He rejoined Chesterfield in December 2020 and signed with Warrington Rylands 1906 in June 2022.

Career

Leicester City
McCourt began his career with Leicester City and signed a professional contract with the "Foxes" in May 2013. On 11 October 2013, he joined League Two side Torquay United on loan for a month. He made his professional debut the next day in a 3–2 to Wycombe Wanderers at Adams Park. On 9 December, McCourt's loan was extended by Torquay United until 4 January 2014. He returned to the King Power Stadium after making 12 appearances in all competitions for Alan Knill's "Gulls". The player signed a new one-year contract with Leicester City in June 2014.

McCourt joined League One side Port Vale on a one-month loan deal on 28 August 2015. Manager Rob Page said he made the signing as cover for the injured Michael Brown, who was the "Valiants" central midfield option on the bench. He started one League Trophy game and made two substitute appearances in the league.

Barnsley
McCourt was sold to League One club Barnsley for an undisclosed fee in January 2016; he signed a contract running until the end of the 2015–16 season. He played two games for Barnsley, both as substitute appearances from the bench, and was an unused substitute for the play-off final victory over Millwall at Wembley Stadium on 29 May. He was then released by the club upon the expiry of his contract in June.

Northampton Town
In June 2016, McCourt signed a two-year contract with League One club Northampton Town, in a move that reunited him with his former Port Vale boss Rob Page. However, he picked up a shoulder injury in pre-season training, which required surgery and an enforced two-month absence. He scored his first senior goal in a 1–1 draw with Scunthorpe United at Glanford Park on 8 October. He received his first sending off seven days later after picking up two yellow cards in a 3–1 defeat to Millwall at Sixfields Stadium. He was transfer-listed by new manager Justin Edinburgh in May 2017 after falling out of the first team in the second half of the 2016–17 season.

Chesterfield
McCourt negotiated his release from Northampton and joined newly relegated League Two side Chesterfield on a two-year deal in July 2017. He scored six goals in 39 appearances across the 2017–18 season as the "Spireites" were relegated out of the English Football League into the National League, and he was made available for a free transfer by new manager Martin Allen in May 2018.

Swindon Town
On 17 July 2018, McCourt joined League Two side Swindon Town on a one-year contract. He was utilised as a holding midfielder by manager Phil Brown, before being moved further forward after Brown was replaced by Richie Wellens in November. He was released by Swindon at the end of the 2018–19 season.

Macclesfield Town
On 5 June 2019, McCourt joined League Two side Macclesfield Town on a one-year contract, becoming Sol Campbell's first summer signing as manager. He featured 21 times for the "Silkmen" during the 2019–20 season and was offered a new contract by new manager Mark Kennedy in the summer. Macclesfield were relegated at the end of the season after having a total of 17 points deducted and were liquidated in September 2020.

Return to Chesterfield
On 1 December 2020, McCourt rejoined Chesterfield, now in the National League, on a short-term contract. He said that he had unfinished business at the club after being at the Proact Stadium when the club lost its Football League status. He quickly impressed manager James Rowe and signed a new 18-month contract later in the month. Chesterfield qualified for the play-offs at the end of the 2020–21 season, though were beaten by Notts County at the quarter-final stage. Rowe was sacked in February 2022 and McCourt was returned to the first-team by caretaker manager Daniel Webb following a period of three months without an appearance. However he picked up an ankle injury after being on the wrong end of a "horrific" tackle later that month. He recovered and was named on the substitute's bench by manager Paul Cook for the play-off semi-final defeat at Solihull Moors.

Warrington Rylands 1906
On 27 June 2022, McCourt signed for newly-promoted Northern Premier League Premier Division side Warrington Rylands 1906.

Buxton
In January 2023, McCourt joined National League North club Buxton.

Style of play
McCourt is an athletic central midfielder with good passing skills. He has been described as a "larger than life character in the dressing room".

Career statistics

Honours
Barnsley
Football League One play-offs: 2016

References

1995 births
Living people
Footballers from Liverpool
English footballers
Association football midfielders
Leicester City F.C. players
Torquay United F.C. players
Port Vale F.C. players
Barnsley F.C. players
Northampton Town F.C. players
Chesterfield F.C. players
Swindon Town F.C. players
Macclesfield Town F.C. players
Warrington Rylands 1906 F.C. players
Buxton F.C. players
English Football League players
National League (English football) players
Northern Premier League players